Prochola holomorpha is a moth of the family Agonoxenidae. It is found in Paraguay.

References

Moths described in 1931
Agonoxeninae
Moths of South America
Taxa named by Edward Meyrick